Urodeta quadrifida is a moth of the family Elachistidae. It is found in South Africa, where it has been recorded from the Tswaing Crater Reserve in Gauteng.

The wingspan is about 6.8 mm. The forewings are mottled with greyish white scales basally and scales ranging from pale brown to blackish brown distally. The hindwings are brownish grey. Adults have been recorded on wing in February.

Etymology
The species name refers to the four spinose spots in female genitalia and is derived from Latin quadrifida (meaning four-divided, split into four).

References

Elachistidae
Moths described in 2012
Moths of Africa